Wiesthal is a community in the Main-Spessart district in the Regierungsbezirk of Lower Franconia (Unterfranken) in Bavaria, Germany and a member of the Verwaltungsgemeinschaft (municipal association) of Partenstein. It has a population of around 1,300.

Geography

Location 
Wiesthal lies in the Aschaffenburg region in the Aubach valley in the Mittelgebirge Spessart.

Subdivision
The community has the following Gemarkungen (traditional rural cadastral areas): Krommenthal and Wiesthal. These are also the two Ortsteile.

History 
Wiesthal is an old glassmaking centre and had its first documentary mention in 1057. The small stream, the Aubach, once split the community into two parts, one belonging to the Bishopric of Mainz and the other to the County of Rieneck. After the Counts of Rieneck had died out, their half likewise passed to the Archbishopric of Mainz. The Electoral Mainz Amt was in Prince Primate von Dalberg's favour secularized and passed with his Principality of Aschaffenburg in 1814 (by this time it had become a department of the Grand Duchy of Frankfurt) to the Kingdom of Bavaria.

On 1 January 1972, Krommenthal was merged with Wiesthal.

Demographics
Within town limits, 1,375 inhabitants were counted in 1970, 1,407 in 1987 and in 2000 1,492.

Economy
According to official statistics, there were 208 workers on the social welfare contribution rolls working in producing businesses in 1998. In trade and transport this was 14. In other areas, 33 workers on the social welfare contribution rolls were employed, and 526 such workers worked from home. There were 0 processing businesses. One business was in construction, and furthermore, in 1999, there were 2 agricultural operations.

The biggest employer is the firm Wenzel-Präzision.

Municipal taxes in 1999 amounted to €794,000 (converted), of which net business taxes amounted to €247,000.

Governance

Mayor
The mayor is Karl-Heinz Hofmann (Freie Wähler), elected in 2020.

Town twinning
  Városlőd, Veszprém, Hungary

Coat of arms 
The community's arms might be described thus: Barry of ten gules and Or a saltire argent surmounted by two glassblower's pipes per saltire of the first, mouthpieces to base.

The Counts of Rieneck bore arms with the field design seen in Wiesthal's arms, and indeed this pattern is meant to recall the time when they held half the community when the local brook was the border between their fief and that held by Mainz. The tinctures gules and argent (red and silver) recall this latter state's former hegemony over the whole community once the Counts had died out (and before that over the other half). The glassblower's pipes recall that Wiesthal was once a glassmaking community, and that the inhabitants, whether lumberjacks, potash makers, waggoners or actually glassmakers, were more or less all somehow linked to glassmaking. The saltire (X-shaped cross), or Saint Andrew's Cross, stands for the chapel, which was already standing by 1477, before the parish of Wiesthal was founded.

The arms have been borne since 1977.

Arts and culture

 Pfarrkirche St. Andreas, Catholic parish church, built 1599/1600
 Ruh- or Mühlhansenmühle, the last of formerly six mills in the community
 Custom: Faselsrad (or Foaseltsroad in the local speech), on Shrove Tuesday (Faschingsdienstag)

Infrastructure

Transport
Wiesthal has a stop on the Main-Spessart railway. It is also located on State Road 2317.

Education 
In 1999 the following institutions existed in Wiesthal:
 Kindergartens: 50 places with 50 children
 Primary schools with 11 teachers and 211 pupils

References

External links 

 Community’s official webpage 

Main-Spessart